Colm is a male given name of Irish origin. Colm can be pronounced "Collum" or "Kullum". It is not an Irish version of Colin, but like Callum and Malcolm derives from a Gaelic variation on columba, the Latin word for 'dove'.

People
Colm Bairéad (born 1981), Irish filmmaker
Colm Brogan (1902–1977), Scottish writer
Colm Byrne (born 1971), Irish playwright
Colm Collins, Gaelic football manager
Colm Condon (1921–2008), Irish lawyer
Colm Connolly (born 1942), Irish broadcaster and author
Colm Cooper (born 1983), Irish Gaelic football player
Colm Coyle (born 1963), Irish Gaelic football player and manager
Colm Feore (born 1958), American-born Canadian actor
Colm Hilliard (1936–2002), Irish politician
Colm Imbert (born 1957), Trinidad and Tobago politician
Colm Magner (born 1961), Canadian actor
Colm Mangan (born 1942), Irish general
Colm Meaney (born 1953), Irish actor
Colm Mulcahy (born 1958), Irish mathematician, academic, columnist and author 
Colm Ó Cíosóig (born 1964), Irish drummer
Colm O'Gorman (born 1966), Irish activist
Colm Ó hEocha (1926–1997), Irish scientist
Colm Ó Maonlaí (born 1966), Irish actor 
Colm O'Shaughnessy (born 1996), Irish Gaelic football player and rugby player
Colm Tóibín (born 1955), Irish novelist
Colm Vance (born 1992), Canadian soccer player
Colm Wilkinson (born 1944), Irish actor and singer

Fictional characters
Colm, in the video game Fire Emblem: The Sacred Stones
Colm O'Driscoll, one of the antagonists in the video game Red Dead Redemption 2
Uncle Colm McCool, from the Channel 4 sitcom Derry Girls
Col. Colm Corbec, in the Warhammer novel series Gaunt's Ghosts
Colm Doherty, played by Brendan Gleeson, in the 2022 film The Banshees of Inisherin

Other uses
× Colmanara, orchid genus abbreviated in trade journals as "Colm"
COLM, Nasdaq code for Columbia Sportswear

See also
List of Irish-language given names
Callum (disambiguation)
Colom (disambiguation)
Colum (disambiguation)

References

Irish-language masculine given names